Shelley Scarrow is a Canadian television producer and writer from Sarnia, Ontario. She won a Writers Guild of Canada award for her work on the Degrassi: The Next Generation season three episode "Pride" (which she shared with her husband James Hurst and Aaron Martin). Scarrow has also been nominated for a Gemini Award. She is a writer on the TV show Being Erica.

References

External links

Canadian television writers
Canadian television producers
People from Sarnia
Living people
Canadian women television producers
Canadian women television writers
Writers from Ontario
Year of birth missing (living people)